Béchar  is the second least-densely populated province (wilaya) in Algeria, named after its capital Béchar.

History

The greater part of the province is dry plains (hamadas) suitable for grazing but with insufficient surface water to support agriculture. Most settlements are therefore concentrated in oases along the Saoura valley and its tributaries. Natural resources include coal deposits in the north around Bechar and Kenadsa.

The oases' traditional economic basis was agriculture, notably growing date palms and grain. The inhabitants of several oases, notably Ouakda, Lahmar and Boukais, speak Berber languages, while the rest speak Arabic. There is a notable zaouia (traditional religious school) at Kenadsa. The region also supported a substantial mainly Arab pastoralist nomadic population, notably the Doui-Menia and Ouled Djerir; most or all have settled in the oases.

Trans-Saharan trade routes passing through this region played an important role in its economy in pre-modern times, but have at present been superseded. A small tourism industry exists, focused particularly on Taghit. Béchar, whose growth from a minor village began only in the early 20th century, has become the principal urban and administrative centre.

The region has a distinctive musical scene influenced by sub-Saharan African rhythms, whose best known representative is the Gnawi singer Hasna El Becharia. Another locally well-known group is El Sed, from Kenadsa.

Disagreements between Morocco and Algeria over their mutual border in this province and Tindouf led to conflict after Algeria's independence, the so-called Sand War.

The province was created from the Saoura department in 1974. In 1984 Tindouf Province was carved out of its territory. In 2019 Béni Abbès Province followed.

Administrative divisions
The province is made up of 6 districts and 11 municipalities.

The districts are:

 Abadla
 Béchar
 Béni Ounif
 Kénadsa
 Lahmar
 Taghit

The municipalities are:

 Abadla
 Béchar
 Beni Ounif
 Boukais
 Erg Ferradj
 Kenadsa
 Lahmar
 Mechraa Houari Boumedienne
 Meridja
 Mogheul
 Taghit

References

 
Provinces of Algeria
States and territories established in 1974